Uwe Mund (born 26 June 1962) is a retired German rower. He competed for East Germany at the 1988 Summer Olympics and finished in fifth place in the double sculls event, together with Uwe Heppner. He won a gold and a silver medal at the senior world championships of 1982 and 1983, respectively; he also won a gold and a silver medal at the junior world championships in 1979 and 1980.

References

1962 births
Living people
People from Südharz
Olympic rowers of East Germany
Rowers at the 1988 Summer Olympics
World Rowing Championships medalists for East Germany
East German male rowers